Denton Designs was a British video game developer based in Liverpool. The company was founded in 1984 and initially specialised in developing software for the ZX Spectrum home computer. Amongst the founders were developers who had worked on the unfinished "Mega game" Bandersnatch for Imagine Software.

History 

Denton Designs was founded in September 1984 by six former Imagine staff - Steve Cain, Ian Weatherburn, Ally Noble, John Gibson, Karen Davies and Graham "Kenny" Everett.

When Denton Designs was contracted to develop Shadowfire, Ian Weatherburn became disillusioned with the fact that the company was no longer operating as it had when they had been part of Imagine, and on issuing an ultimatum was sacked by the rest of the directors. He subsequently joined Ocean.

In March 1986, the company split, with founders Cain, Davies, Everett and Gibson leaving. Of the original founders, only Ally Noble remained.

In December 1995, Denton Designs was acquired by Rage Software.

Games developed

References 

Defunct video game companies of the United Kingdom
Video game companies established in 1984
Video game companies disestablished in 1995
Defunct companies based in Liverpool
1984 establishments in England
1995 disestablishments in England